Gallinas River or Rio Gallinas is a river with its source in San Miguel County, New Mexico, and confluence with the Pecos River in Guadalupe County, New Mexico. It is a tributary of the Pecos River, which is a tributary of the Rio Grande. The river has a tributary, Gallinas Creek, with its confluence just southeast of Las Vegas, New Mexico.

References

Rivers of New Mexico